The 1871 South Norfolk by-election was fought on 17 April 1871.  The byelection was fought due to the Death of the incumbent MP of the Conservative Party, Edward Howes.  It was won by the Conservative candidate Sir Robert Jacob Buxton.

References

1871 elections in the United Kingdom
1871 in England
19th century in Norfolk
By-elections to the Parliament of the United Kingdom in Norfolk constituencies